The Endeavour River (Guugu Yimithirr: Wabalumbaal), inclusive of the Endeavour River Right Branch, the Endeavour River South Branch, and the Endeavour River North Branch, is a river system located on Cape York Peninsula in Far North Queensland, Australia.

Course and features
The river system comprises three branches that are sourced by runoff from the Henderson and Audaer Ranges. The river flows generally east from the Great Dividing Range to the Coral Sea.

In recent years, tilapia fish, which are considered an "invasive species" in Australia, have infested the river, causing concern that the stocks of native fish will suffer.

The river basin remains largely unmodified and the water quality is rated as good.

History

James Cook, RN named the river in 1770 after he was forced to beach his ship, for repairs in the river mouth, after damaging it on Endeavour Reef. Joseph Banks named the river the Endeavours River but the form Cook used, Endeavour River, has stuck.

Cook and his crew remained for almost seven weeks and made contact with the local Guugu Yimithirr Aborigines, while the naturalists Joseph Banks and Daniel Solander made extensive collections of native flora, while Sydney Parkinson illustrated much of the flora and fauna of the region.

Modern Cooktown which has a population of about 2,000, is located at the mouth of the Endeavour River. It is one of the northernmost towns on the East Coast of Australia and was founded in 1873, around the site of Cook's landing, as a port to service the newly discovered Palmer River Goldfields. Some of the relatively undisturbed natural features near the mouth of the river have been reserved in the Endeavour River National Park.

See also

 
 Tilapia as exotic species

References

Bibliography

External links

Rivers of Far North Queensland
Bodies of water of the Coral Sea